The Russia national handball team is controlled by the Handball Federation of Russia. Russia is designated by IHF and EHF.

In reaction to the 2022 Russian invasion of Ukraine, the International Handball Federation banned Russian and Belarus athletes and officials, and the European Handball Federation suspended the national teams of Russia and Belarus as well as Russian and Belarusian clubs competing in European handball competitions. Referees, officials, and commission members from Russia and Belarus will not be called upon for future activities. And new organisers will be sought for the YAC 16 EHF Beach Handball EURO and the Qualifier Tournaments for the Beach Handball EURO 2023, which were to be held in Moscow.

History
Handball in Russia as one of the sports games appeared approx. in 1909. In the first period of its development the handball in Russia had two forms, 11 players form and 7 players form. In 1955 was set up the All-Union section (federation) of handball. By early 60s was finally approved a single form of handball game – 7 players form.

In reaction to the 2022 Russian invasion of Ukraine, the International Handball Federation banned Russian and Belarus athletes and officials, and the European Handball Federation suspended the national teams of Russia and Belarus as well as Russian and Belarusian clubs competing in European handball competitions. Referees, officials, and commission members from Russia and Belarus will not be called upon for future activities. And new organisers will be sought for the YAC 16 EHF Beach Handball EURO and the Qualifier Tournaments for the Beach Handball EURO 2023, which were to be held in Moscow. In addition, it refused to allow competitions to be held in Russia. The Russian Handball Federation failed in its appeal against the decision to exclude Russia's teams from continental competition, which was rejected by the European Handball Federation Court of Handball.

Honours

Results

Summer Olympics

World Championship

European Championship

Team

Current squad
Squad for the 2022 European Men's Handball Championship.

Coaching staff

Notable players
   Andrey Lavrov
  Talant Dujshebaev
 Pavel Sukosyan
 Vyacheslav Gorpishin
 Eduard Koksharov
 Vasily Kudinov
 Dmitry Filippov
 Denis Krivoshlykov
 Serguei Pogorelov
 Dmitri Torgovanov
 Aleksandr Tuchkin
 Stanislav Kulinchenko
 Valeri Gopin
 Oleg Kisselev
 Alexey Kamanin
 Alexey Kostygov
 Alexander Chernoivanov
 Vitaly Ivanov
 Vasily Filippov
 Lev Voronin
 Vyacheslav Atavin
 Oleg Grebnev
 Pavel Bashkin

Statistics

Most capped players

 

Top scorers

References

External links

IHF profile

Men's national handball teams
Men
Handball